Luisa Sigea de Velasco (1522 in Tarancón – October 13, 1560 in Burgos), also known as Luisa Sigeia, Luisa Sigea Toledana and in the Latinized form Aloysia Sygaea Toletana, was a poet and intellectual, one of the major figures of Spanish humanism, who spent a good part of her life in the Portuguese court in the service of Maria of Portugal (1521–1577), as her Latin teacher. André de Resende wrote the following epitaph for her: Hic sita SIGAEA est: satis hoc: qui cetera nescit | Rusticus est: artes nec colit ille bonas (loosely translated: 'Here lies Sigea; no more need be said; anyone who does not know the rest is an uneducated fool').

Early years
Luisa Sigea de Velasco was born in 1522 in Tarancón, the fourth child of the Spanish noblewoman, Francisca Velasco, and Diogo Sigeo, a Frenchman. She had a sister, Ângela, and two brothers, Diogo and António. Her father had moved to Spain as a boy and was educated at University of Alcalá, where he learnt Latin, Ancient Greek and Hebrew. In 1522, he was connected to the failed revolution in Castile led by Juan de Padilla and known as the 'Revolt of the Comuneros'. Diogo fled to Portugal where he became tutor to the children of the Duke of Bragança, bringing his family to join him in around 1536. Luisa was then educated by her father, along with the rest of her siblings. As women were excluded from all European Universities at the time, this meant the Sigea girls received an education rarely afforded to other contemporary women, and almost never outside a monastic context. The family was relatively poor and of dubious reputation after Diogo's flight from Spain. As such, neither of the Sigea girls would be able to make a particularly advantageous marriage. Their unique education was therefore a means for them to make their way in the world and is directly linked to their ultimate social standing.

The Court of Maria of Portugal (1521–1577)
The Infanta Maria's father died when she was six months old and her mother remarried and left for France three years later, being forced to leave the infant Maria behind. This, coupled with her enormous fortune, was one of the reasons why Maria was able never to marry and establish a court for herself. She surrounded herself with humanist writers and artists, of whom Luisa was one. Luisa taught the princess Latin and was paid 16,000 reis a year. Luisa wrote her most famous works during this time. Despite this, Sigea wrote in Latin to her brother-in-law, Alfonso de Cuevas, saying that after thirteen years' hard work, she had not even been given her promised salary. Yet the Infanta's regard for Luisa can be seen in the fact that her will bestows an annuity of 12,000 reis to Luisa's daughter, Juana.

Later life
In 1552, Sigea married Francisco de Cuevas, a nobleman from Burgos, Spain. Shortly after this, Luisa left court to live in Burgos and the couple had one daughter, Juana de Cuevas Sigea. In 1558, Luisa and her husband found work at the court of Mary of Hungary, the daughter of Philip I of Spain. Francisco worked as a secretary and Luisa as a Latinist, but the post lasted only a few months, as Queen Maria died shortly afterwards. The rest of Luisa'a life was spent trying to gain another position at court, but to no avail. She died in Burgos on 13 October 1560.

Literary works
Luisa wrote her most famous literary works during her time at the court of Maria of Portugal (1521–1577), and later at her house. These include Syntra, a Latin poem dedicated to Maria, which was published in France in 1566 by her father and Duarum Virginum Colloquium de vita aulica et privata (Dialogue between two Virgins on Court Life and Private Life), a bucolic dialogue, which was also published in France, in 1562, by the intervention of the French ambassador in Portugal. Aside from these works, we also have many of Luisa's letters. These include a number sent to Pope Paul III, written in several different languages.

In 1553, Maria was briefly married to Philip I of Portugal, later Philip II of Spain. The marriage was annulled 24 hours later, but Luisa wrote Syntra for the occasion. Syntra refers to the forest of Sintra, near Lisbon. In the poem, a nymph gives a prophecy relating to Maria's marriage to a powerful man who will rule the world. The poem contains learned allusions to Ovid, Virgil and Homer, with some also suggesting connections to the works of female classical poets, Sappho and Sulpicia. Despite the mistaken prophecy, this poem had a positive effect on Luisa's reputation at court.

Duarum Virginum Colloquium de vita aulica et privata is a dialogue between two women on whether it is better to live at court or in a private home, a well-trodden humanism theme. In this work, Luisa thanks Maria for giving her the time and space to work, acknowledging the unique position she finds herself in as a member of the Infanta's court. Although the immediate reception was positive, the work then fell into comparative obscurity until the early twentieth century.

Letters
Luisa's letters paint a rich picture of her intellectual life and clearly display her proficiency as a humanist writer. They are written to a large number of key figures of contemporary European politics and contain an abundance of Classics references. They also serve as a useful source on what classical texts were available in Portugal, at the time.

Satyra Sotadica – the hoax
In 1680 an erotic work was published, entitled Aloysiæ Sigeæ Toletanæ satyra sotadica de arcanis amoris et veneris: Aloysia hispanice scripsit: latinitate donavit J. Meursius. The title translates as "Luisa Sigea Toledana's Sotadic satire, on the secrets of love and sex; Luisa wrote it in Spanish; it has here been translated into Latin by J. Meursius." Johannes Meursius (1579–1639) was a Dutch classical scholar and antiquary. "Sotadic" refers to Sotades, the 3rd-century BC Greek poet who was the chief representative of a group of writers of obscene, and sometimes pederastic, satirical poetry.

This is widely considered the first-ever fully pornographic work written in Latin, and it contains among other things a defence of tribadism (i.e. lesbianism). The attribution to Sigea (as well as the attribution to Meursius) was a hoax, as was first demonstrated by Bruno Lavignini in his edition of the poem (Italy, 1905). It is believed that the true author was the Frenchman Nicolas Chorier. The work was translated into many other languages, including English, under the title Dialogues of Luisa Sigea.

References

Bibliography
 Sintra, in António Maria Vasco de Melo César e Meneses, conde de Sabugosa, O Paço de Cintra, apontamentos historicos e archeologicos, Câmara Municipal de Sintra, 1989–1990, facsimile edition of that published by the Imprensa Nacional de Lisboa in 1903
 Dialogue de deux jeunes filles sur la vie de cour et la vie de retraite (1552); edition and commentary by Odette Sauvage. Paris: Presses Universitaires de France, 1970
 Sigea, Luisa (1566) Syntra Aloisiae Sygçae toletanae, aliq ́aue eiusdem, ac non- nullorum praetereà doctorum virorum ad eandem epigrammata: quibus acces- sit Pauli III. p.m. epistola de singulari eius doctrina, ac ingenij praestantia. Paris: D. à Prato.
 Sofia Frade, "Hic sita Sigea est: satis hoc: Luisa Sigea and the Role of D. Maria, Infanta of Portugal, in Female Scholarship." Women Classical Scholars: Unsealing the Fountain from the Renaissance to Jacqueline de Romilly. : Oxford University Press,  November 17, 2016.

Further reading
 
 Ana Maria Alves, Comunicazione e silenzio in un diálogo umanistico. A propósito di Luísa Sigea, in Davide Bigalli e Guido Canziani (eds.), Il diálogo filosófico nel '500 europeo, Atti del Convegno internazionale di studi (Milano, 28–30 maggio 1987), Milano, FrancoAngeli, 1990
 André de Resende, Ludovicae Sigaeae tumulus, Rio de Janeiro, 1981 (facsimile edition reproducing the edition Lisboa, 1561), 
 Carolina Michaëlis de Vasconcellos, A Infanta D. Maria de Portugal (1521–1577) e as suas damas, Edição facsímile, Lisboa, CNCDP, 1994
 Edward V. George, "Luisa Sigea (1522–1560): Iberian Scholar – Poet", in: Laurie J. Churchill, ed. Women Writing in Latin: from Roman Antiquity to Early Modern Europe. 3 vols. New York: Routledge, 2002; Vol. 3, pp. 167–187
 Edward V. George, "Sly Wit and Careful Concession: Luisa Sigea’s Dialogue on Court versus Private Life", in: Studia Philologica Valentina, 4 n.s. 1 (2000), pp. 173–192
 Ismael García Ramila, "Nuevas e interesantes noticias, basadas en fe documental, sobre la vida y descendencia familiar burgalesa de la famosa humanista, Luisa de Sigea, la 'Minerva' de los renacentistas", in Boletín de la Institución Fernán González, XXXVIII, 144 (1958), pp. 309–321; XXXVIII, 145 (1959), pp. 465–492; XXXVIII, 147 (1959), pp. 565–593
 José Silvestre Ribeiro, Luiza Sigéa: breves apontamentos histórico-literários, Lisboa, Academia Real das Ciências de Lisboa, 1880
 Manuel Serrano y Sanz, "Apuntes para una biblioteca de escritoras españolas, desde el año 1401 al 1833", Tomo II, Madrid, Revista de Archivos, Bibliotecas y Museos, 1905, pág. 394
 María Regla Prieto Corbalán (2007) Luisa Sigea. Madrid: Akal. Clásicos latinos medievales, 21.
 Nicolas Chorier, Aloisiæ Sigeæ Toletanæ Satyra Sotadica de Arcanis Amoris et Veneris. Aloisa Hispanice scripsit, Latinitate donavit Joannes Meursius (or rather by Nicolas Chorier), Parisiis, 1885. 8vo. xxxvi+342 pp.
 Paul-Auguste Allut, Aloysia Sygea et Nicolas Chorier. Lyon: N. Scheuring, 1862.
  Raúl Amores Pérez, Biografía de Luisa Sigea Toledana. Una taranconera del siglo XVI en la corte portuguesa y española, in Seminario de Estudios Medievales y Renacentistas (SEMYR). Pérez Priego, M. A. (coord.). Melchor Cano y Luisa Sigea. Dos figuras del Renacimiento español. Tarancón: Ayuntamiento /Centro Asociado de la UNED, 2008, pp. 167–265.
 Sira Lucía Garrido Marcos, Luisa Sigea Toledana, Universidad Complutense de Madrid (unpublished dissertation), 1955 (658 pp., T-7298)
 Sofia Frade, "Hic sita Sigea est: satis hoc: Luisa Sigea and the Role of D. Maria, Infanta of Portugal, in Female Scholarship." Women Classical Scholars: Unsealing the Fountain from the Renaissance to Jacqueline de Romilly. : Oxford University Press,  November 17, 2016. 
 Sol Miguel Prendes, "A Specific Case of the Docta Foemina: Luisa Sigea and her Duarum Virginum Colloquium de Vita Aulica et Privata", in: Acta Conventus Neo-Latini Abulensis: Proceedings of the Tenth International Congress of NeoLatin Studies, (Ávila, 1997), Tempe, Ariz. : Arizona Center for Medieval & Renaissance Texts & Studies, 2000
 Susanne Thiemann, Vom Glück der Gelehrsamkeit: Luisa Sigea, Humanistin im 16. Jahrhundert, (Ergebnisse der Frauen- und Geschlechterforschung an der Freien Universität Berlin; No 9.), Göttingen: Wallstein Verlag, 2006,

External links 
Blog sobre Luisa Sigea de Velasco. Estudios y textos, por Raúl Amores Pérez
Luisa Sigea
Baranda: De investigación y bibliografía. Con unas notas documentales sobre Luisa Sigea
Luísa Sigea, por Américo da Costa Ramalho
Biografia de Luisa Sigea Toledana
Colégio D. Luísa Sigea, Estoril

Spanish women poets
1522 births
1560 deaths
Velasco
Portuguese ladies-in-waiting
16th-century Latin-language writers
New Latin-language poets